Amelia Opie (née Alderson; 12 November 1769 – 2 December 1853) was an English author who published numerous novels in the Romantic period up to 1828. Opie was also a leading abolitionist in Norwich, England. Hers was the first of 187,000 names presented to the British Parliament on a petition from women to stop slavery.

Early life and influences
Amelia Alderson was born 12 November 1769. An only child, she was the daughter of James Alderson, a physician, and Amelia Briggs of Norwich. Her mother also brought her up to care for those who came from less privileged backgrounds. After her mother's death on 31 December 1784, she became her father's housekeeper and hostess, remaining very close to him until his death in 1807.

According to her biographer, Opie "was vivacious, attractive, interested in fine clothes, educated in genteel accomplishments, and had several admirers."(3) She was a cousin of the judge, Edward Hall Alderson, with whom she corresponded throughout her life, and was also a cousin of the artist, Henry Perronet Briggs. Alderson inherited radical principles and was an ardent admirer of John Horne Tooke. She was close to activists John Philip Kemble, Sarah Siddons, William Godwin and Mary Wollstonecraft.

Career

Opie spent her youth writing poetry and plays and organizing amateur theatricals. She wrote The Dangers of Coquetry when she was 18 years old.

Opie completed a novel in 1801 titled Father and Daughter. Characterized as showing genuine fancy and pathos, the novel is about misled virtue and family reconciliation. After it came out, Opie began to publish regularly. Her volume of Poems, published in 1802, went through six editions. Encouraged by her husband to continue writing, she published Adeline Mowbray (1804), an exploration of women's education, marriage, and the abolition of slavery. This novel in particular is noted for engaging the history of Opie's former friend Mary Wollstonecraft, whose relationship with the American Gilbert Imlay outside of marriage caused some scandal, as did her later marriage to the philosopher William Godwin. Godwin had previously argued against marriage as an institution by which women were owned as property, but when Wollstonecraft became pregnant, they married despite his prior beliefs. In the novel, Adeline becomes involved with a philosopher early on, who takes a firm stand against marriage, only to be convinced to marry a West Indian landowner against her better judgement. The novel also engages abolitionist sentiment, in the story of a mixed-race woman and her family, whom Adeline saves from poverty at some expense to herself.

More novels followed: Simple Tales (1806), Temper (1812), Tales of Real Life (1813), Valentine's Eve (1816), Tales of the Heart (1818), and Madeline (1822). The Warrior's Return and other poems was published in 1808.

In 1825, Opie joined the Society of Friends, due to the influence of Joseph John Gurney and his sisters, who were long-time friends and neighbours in Norwich, and despite the objections made by her recently deceased father. The rest of her life was spent mostly in travel and working with charities. Meanwhile she published an anti-slavery poem titled, The Black Man's Lament in 1826 and a volume of devotional poems, Lays for the Dead in 1834. Opie worked with Anna Gurney to create a Ladies Anti-Slavery Society in Norwich. This anti-slavery society organised a petition of 187,000 names that was presented to parliament. The first two names on the petition were Amelia Opie and Priscilla Buxton. Opie went to the World Anti-Slavery Convention in London in 1840 where she was one of the few women included in the commemorative painting.

Personal life
In 1798, she married John Opie, a painter whom she had met at a party in Norwich, where Opie had come to carry out some commissions for Thomas Coke at Holkham Hall. They lived at 8 Berners Street, where Opie had moved in 1791. The couple spent nine years happily married, although her husband did not share her love of society, until his death in 1807. She divided her time between London and Norwich. She was a friend of writers Walter Scott, Richard Brinsley Sheridan and Germaine de Staël. Even late in life, Opie maintained connections with writers, for instance receiving George Borrow as a guest. After a visit to Cromer, a seaside resort on the North Norfolk coast, she caught a chill and retired to her bedroom. A year later on 2 December 1853, she died at Norwich and was said to have retained her vivacity to the last. She was buried at the Gildencroft Quaker Cemetery, Norwich.

A somewhat sanitised biography of Opie, entitled A Life, by Cecilia Lucy Brightwell, was published in 1854.

Selected works
Novels and stories
Dangers of Coquetry (published anonymously) 1790
The Father and Daughter 1801
Adeline Mowbray 1804
Simple Tales 1806
Temper; or, Domestic Scenes 1812
First Chapter of Accidents 1813
Tales of Real Life 1813
Valentine's Eve 1816
New Tales 1818
Tales of the Heart 1820
The Only Child; or, Portia Bellendon (published anonymously) 1821
Madeline, A Tale 1822
Illustrations of Lying 1824
Tales of the Pemberton Family for Children 1825
The Last Voyage 1828
Detraction Displayed 1828
Miscellaneous Tales (12 Vols) 1845–1847

Biographies
Memoir of John Opie 1809
Sketch of Mrs. Roberts 1814

Poetry
Maid of Corinth 1801
Elegy to the Memory of the Duke of Bedford 1802
Poems 1802
Lines to General Kosciusko 1803
Song to Stella 1803
The Warrior's Return and other poems 1808
The Black Man's Lament 1826 (Wikisource text)
Lays for the Dead 1834

Miscellaneous
Recollections of Days in Holland 1840
Recollections of a Visit to Paris in 1802 1831–1832
Winter's Beautiful Rose, a song with words by Opie and music by Jane Bianchi dedicated to the Viscountesses Hampden

References

Further reading

Susan K. Howard, "Amelia Opie", British Romantic Novelists, 1789–1832. Ed. Bradford K. Mudge. Detroit: Gale Research, 1992

Gary Kelly, English Fiction of the Romantic Period, 1789–1830. London: Longman, 1989
Shelley King and John B. Pierce, "Introduction", The Father and Daughter with Dangers of Coquetry. Peterborough: Broadview Press, 2003
James R. Simmons, Jr, "Amelia Opie". British Short-Fiction Writers, 1800–1880, ed. John R. Greenfield. Detroit: Gale Research, 1996
Dale Spender, Mothers of the Novel: 100 Good Women Writers Before Jane Austen. London: Pandora, 1986
William St. Clair, The Godwins and Shelleys: The Biography of a Family. London: Faber and Faber, 1989

Susan Staves, "British Seduced Maidens", Eighteenth-Century Studies 12 (1980–81): 109–134
Eleanor Ty, Empowering the Feminine: The Narratives of Mary Robinson, Jane West, and Amelia Opie, 1796–1812. Toronto: University of Toronto Press, 1998

External links
Amelia Opie at the Eighteenth-Century Poetry Archive (ECPA)

Amelia Opie and Norwich

Cecilia Lucy Brightwell, Memorials of the life of Amelia Opie, London: Longman, Brown, & Co., 1854
The Amelia Alderson Opie Archive
Amelia Opie at Poeticous

1769 births
1853 deaths
Writers from Norwich
19th-century English novelists
British abolitionists
English Quakers
English women poets
English biographers
Romanticism
18th-century British women writers
19th-century English women writers
Women biographers
Quaker abolitionists